</noinclude>

Diego Leonardo Martínez (born August 9, 1984 in Comandante Nicanor Otamendi (Buenos Aires), Argentina) is an Argentine footballer who playing for Atlanta of the Primera B Metropolitana in Argentine.

Teams
  Aldosivi de Mar del Plata 2005-2007
  Alumni de Villa María 2007
  Aldosivi de Mar del Plata 2008-2011
  San Lorenzo 2011-2012
  Patronato de Paraná 2012
  Rangers 2013
  Defensa y Justicia 2013-2014
  Talleres Córdoba 2014-2015
  Atlanta 2015-

References

1984 births
Living people
Argentine footballers
Argentine expatriate footballers
Club Atlético Patronato footballers
Aldosivi footballers
San Lorenzo de Almagro footballers
Rangers de Talca footballers
Chilean Primera División players
Argentine Primera División players
Torneo Federal A players
Primera B Metropolitana players
Expatriate footballers in Chile

Association footballers not categorized by position
Footballers from Buenos Aires